The Santa Fe Trail Scenic and Historic Byway is a  National Scenic Byway and Colorado Scenic and Historic Byway located in Prowers, Bent, Otero, and Las Animas counties, Colorado, USA. The byway follows the Santa Fe National Historic Trail through southeastern Colorado and connects to the  Santa Fe Trail Scenic Byway in New Mexico at Raton Pass, a National Historic Landmark at elevation .  The byway visits Amache National Historic Site and Bent's Old Fort National Historic Site, both National Historic Landmarks, and winds between the Spanish Peaks and Raton Mesa, both National Natural Landmarks.

The byway connects with the Highway of Legends National Scenic Byway at Trinidad.

Route

Attractions
Santa Fe National Historic Trail
National Old Trails Road
Amache National Historic Site
John Martin Reservoir State Park
Fort Lyon
Boggsville
Bent's Old Fort National Historic Site
Koshare Indian Museum and Dancers
Comanche National Grassland
Trinidad History Museum
Trinidad Lake State Park
Fishers Peak State Park

Gallery

See also

History Colorado
List of scenic byways in Colorado
Scenic byways in the United States

Notes

References

External links

America's Byways
America's Scenic Byways: Colorado
Colorado Department of Transportation
Colorado Scenic & Historic Byways Commission
Colorado Scenic & Historic Byways
Colorado Travel Map
Colorado Tourism Office
History Colorado

Colorado Scenic and Historic Byways
National Scenic Byways
National Scenic Byways in Colorado
Santa Fe Trail
Amache National Historic Site
Bent's Old Fort National Historic Site

Transportation in Colorado
Transportation in Bent County, Colorado
Transportation in Las Animas County, Colorado
Transportation in Otero County, Colorado
Transportation in Prowers County, Colorado
Tourist attractions in Colorado
Tourist attractions in Bent County, Colorado
Tourist attractions in Las Animas County, Colorado
Tourist attractions in Otero County, Colorado
Tourist attractions in Prowers County, Colorado
Interstate 25
U.S. Route 50
U.S. Route 85
U.S. Route 87
U.S. Route 160
U.S. Route 287
U.S. Route 350
U.S. Route 385